An Insomniac's Nightmare is a 2003 film that stars Dominic Monaghan and was created and released by Jagged Edge Films.

Monaghan plays Jack, an insomniac in the city, fading in and out of reality through his own thoughts. He suffers many hallucinations including visions of the dead, in particular his best friend. He continually tells himself to wake up, but Jack is not asleep. He kills himself only to find that it is another hallucination, and only once morning comes do things stabilize even marginally, still creeping into insanity.

External links

2003 films
2003 short films
2003 thriller films
American independent films
American thriller films
2003 independent films
2000s English-language films
2000s American films